Jolien Maliga Boumkwo (born 27 August 1993, in Ghent) is a Belgian athlete competing in the shot put and hammer throw. She hold national records in both events.

International competitions

Personal bests
Outdoor
Shot put – 17.09 (Brussels 2016) NR
Discus throw – 50.60 (Kessel-Lo 2014)
Hammer throw – 67.30 (Brussels 2016)
Indoor
Shot put – 17,87 (Ghent 2023) NR

References

All-Athletics profile

1993 births
Living people
Belgian female shot putters
Belgian female hammer throwers
Sportspeople from Ghent